Alex Edward Redmond (born January 18, 1995) is an American football offensive guard who is a free agent. He played college football at UCLA.

Early years
Redmond played high school football at Los Alamitos High School in Los Alamitos, California. He also lettered three years in wrestling at Los Alamitos, becoming the first wrestling state finalist in school history.

College career
Redmond played for the UCLA Bruins of the University of California, Los Angeles from 2013 to 2015. He started all 13 games at right guard in 2013, tying the school record for most single-season starts by a true freshman position player. He earned Honorable Mention All-Pac-12 honors in 2013. Redmond was also named a First Team Freshman All-American by the Sporting News, Athlon Sports and the Football Writers Association of America. He started eight games at right guard in 2014, earning Honorable Mention All-Pac-12 honors. He played in 12 games, starting 10, in 2015. Redmond was declared academically ineligible prior to the team's final game of the 2015 season, the Foster Farms Bowl. He also declared for the 2016 NFL Draft prior to the game. However, Redmond stated that he had always planned to enter the draft after three years. He also said that turning professional would help him support his daughter. He majored in history at UCLA.

Professional career
Redmond was rated the 21st best offensive guard in the 2016 NFL Draft by NFLDraftScout.com. Lance Zierlein of NFL.com predicted that he would be drafted in the seventh round or be a priority free agent.

Cincinnati Bengals
After going undrafted, he signed with the Cincinnati Bengals on May 6, 2016. He was waived by the Bengals on September 3 and signed to the team's practice squad on September 4, 2016. He signed a reserve/future contract with the Bengals on January 2, 2017.

He became a full-time starter in 2018, starting 15 games at right guard.

Redmond was suspended the first four games of the 2019 season for violating the league's performance-enhancing drug policy. He was reinstated from suspension on October 1, 2019, and was activated on October 7. He was placed on injured reserve on November 29, 2019 after suffering a torn biceps during pregame warmups in Week 12.

On April 8, 2020, Redmond was re-signed to a one-year, $2.133 million contract. He was placed on the active/non-football injury list at the start of training camp on July 29, 2020. He was activated on August 31, 2020. He was released on September 6, 2020, and re-signed to the practice squad on September 21. He was promoted to the active roster on October 3, 2020.

New England Patriots
On May 17, 2021, Redmond signed with the New England Patriots. He was released on August 31, 2021 and re-signed to the practice squad.

References

External links
College stats

Living people
1995 births
American football offensive guards
Cincinnati Bengals players
New England Patriots players
People from Cerritos, California
Players of American football from Long Beach, California
UCLA Bruins football players